Below are the results of the third season of the Asia Pacific Poker Tour.  All currencies are US dollars unless otherwise stated.

Events

APPT Macao
 Casino: Lisboa Hotel & Casino, Macau
 Buy-in: 40,000 HKD (5,160 USD)
 7-Day Event: August 24–30, 2009
 Number of buy-ins: 429
 Total Prize Pool: $2,080,999
 Number of Payouts: 48

APPT Auckland
 Casino: Skycity Casino
 Buy-in: NZD 3,250 Buy-in
 5-Day Event: October 14–18, 2009
 Number of buy-ins: 263
 Total Prize Pool: $581,785
 Number of Payouts: 32

APPT Cebu
 Casino: Shangri-la Mactan Resort, Cebu
 Buy-in: 100,000 PHP
 5-Day Event: November 11–15, 2009
 Number of buy-ins: 319
 Total Prize Pool: $630,312
 Number of Payouts: 40

APPT Sydney
 Casino: Star City Casino, Sydney
 Buy-in: 6,300 AUD
 6-Day Event: Dez 1-6, 2009
 Number of buy-ins: $2,173,038
 Total Prize Pool: 396
 Number of Payouts: 48

Notes

External links
Official site

Asia Pacific Poker Tour
2009 in poker